Hainan HNA Infrastructure Investment Group Co., Ltd. formerly Hainan Island Construction Co., Ltd. is a Chinese listed company based in Haikou. in mid-2016 the company acquired HNA Infrastructure Group in a reverse IPO from intermediate parent company HNA Infrastructure Holding Group, which HNA Infrastructure Group is the parent company of HNA Real Estate and HNA Airport Group (in turn HNA Airport Group is the parent company of HNA Airport Holdings (Group) and HNA Airport Holdings is the parent company of Sanya Phoenix International Airport Co., Ltd.); HNA Airport Group is the largest shareholder of Haikou Meilan International Airport (19.58% as at October 2016), which in turn the largest shareholder of Hong Kong listed company HNA Infrastructure. In December 2016 a proposed capital increase of the HK-listed company was announced. HNA Infrastructure Investment Group would purchase a minority share directly. Haikou Meilan International Airport was the second-largest shareholder of Hainan Airlines; Hainan Airlines, however, also owned a minority stake in Haikou Meilan International Airport.

The registered office was located in Meilan District, but the general office was located in West Zone 21/F, HNA Building on 7 Guoxing Avenue.

History

HNA Infrastructure Investment Group
The predecessor of HNA Infrastructure Investment Group was incorporated on 12 May 1993 as The First Investment and Merchant. In 2002 it became a listed company in Shanghai Stock Exchange. In 2008 the company was renamed to Hainan Zhuxin Investment and again in 2011 to Hainan Island Construction. In 2009 a subsidiary of HNA Group formed a new intermediate holding company with the largest and second largest shareholder of the listed company, making HNA Group was the indirect largest shareholder for 23.59% shares (69.7225 million in number). In 2012 another subsidiary of HNA Group acquired a significant stake (30.09%) of the company, by acquiring 127,214,170 number of new shares for  each; the ex-largest shareholder still owned 9.40% shares at that time as the second largest, making HNA Group owned 39.49% combined indirectly.

On 2 November 2016 HNA Industrial Group acquired 1 million number of shares from the public market, making HNA Industrial Group owned 60.84% shares directly and indirectly.

HNA Infrastructure Group
HNA Infrastructure Group was incorporated on 24 November 2011 as a first tier subsidiary of HNA Group. However, in the same year the entire share capital of HNA Infrastructure Group were transferred to another sister company Hainan HNA Infrastructure Holding (later renamed to HNA Infrastructure Holding Group). In July 2016, a reverse takeover of HNA Infrastructure Group by listed company HNA Infrastructure Investment Group (formerly Hainan Island Construction) was completed.

Subsidiaries

 HNA Infrastructure Group (100%)
 HNA Airport Group (86.48%)
 Weifang Nanyuan Airport (100%)
 Manzhouli Airport Asset Management (67.00%)
 Tangshan Sannühe Airport Management (67.00%)
 Yingkou Airport (60.00%)
 Anqing Tianzhushan Airport (100%)
 HNA Airport Holdings (50.20%)
Sanya Phoenix International Airport (72.49%)
Yichang Sanxia Airport (90.00%)
Manzhouli Xijiao Airport (67.00%)
 Hainan International Tourism Island Development and Construction Group (100%)

Associate companies
 Haikou Meilan International Airport Co., Ltd. (19.58% via HNA Airport Group; additional stake held by another subsidiary of HNA Group)
 HNA Infrastructure (50.19%)
 Hainan Airlines (7.08%, additional stake held by HNA Group and related company Grand China Air)

References

External links
  

Companies listed on the Shanghai Stock Exchange
HNA Group
Airport operators of China